Dame Helen Mirren is an English actor known for her prolific career in film, television, and on stage.

Filmography

Film

Television

Music videos

Theatre

 Cleopatra, Antony and Cleopatra, National Youth Theatre, Old Vic Theatre, London, 1965
 Cathleen, Long Day's Journey into Night, Century Theatre, Manchester, 1965
 Kitty, Charley's Aunt, Century Theatre, Manchester, 1967
 Nerissa, The Merchant of Venice, Century Theatre, Manchester, 1967
 Castiza, The Revenger's Tragedy, Royal Shakespeare Company, Stratford-upon-Avon, 1967
 Diana, All's Well That Ends Well, Royal Shakespeare Company, Stratford-upon-Avon, 1967
 Cressida, Troilus and Cressida, Royal Shakespeare Company, Aldwych Theatre, London, 1968
 Hero, Much Ado About Nothing, Royal Shakespeare Company, Aldwych Theatre, 1968–1969
 Win-the-Fight Littlewit, Bartholomew Fair, Royal Shakespeare Company, Aldwych Theatre, 1969
 Lady Anne, Richard III, Royal Shakespeare Company, Stratford-upon-Avon, 1970
 Ophelia, Hamlet, Royal Shakespeare Company, Stratford-upon-Avon, 1970
 Julia, The Two Gentlemen of Verona, Royal Shakespeare Company, Stratford-upon-Avon, 1970
 Tatyana, Enemies, Royal Shakespeare Company, Aldwych Theatre, 1971
 Harriet, The Man of Mode, Royal Shakespeare Company, Aldwych Theatre, 1971
 Title role, Miss Julie, Royal Shakespeare Company, Aldwych Theatre, 1971
 Elayne, The Balcony, Royal Shakespeare Company, Aldwych Theatre, 1971
 Isabella, Measure for Measure, Riverside Studios, London, 1974
 Lady Macbeth, Macbeth, Royal Shakespeare Company, Stratford-upon-Avon, 1974, then Aldwych Theatre, 1975
 Maggie, Teeth 'n' Smiles, Royal Court Theatre, London, 1975, then Wyndham's Theatre, London, 1976
 Nina, The Seagull, Lyric Theatre, London, 1975
 Ella, The Bed Before Yesterday, Lyric Theatre, 1975
 Queen Margaret, Henry VI, Parts I, II and III, Royal Shakespeare Company, Stratford-upon-Avon, 1977, then Aldwych Theatre, 1978
 Title role, The Duchess of Malfi, Royal Exchange Theatre, Manchester, 1980, then The Roundhouse, London, 1981
 Grace, Faith Healer, Royal Court Theatre, 1981
 Cleopatra, Antony and Cleopatra, Pit Theatre, London, 1983
 Moll Cutpurse, The Roaring Girl, Barbican Theatre, London, 1983
 Marjorie, Extremities, Duchess Theatre, London, 1984
 Title role, Madame Bovary, Watford Palace Theatre, 1987
 Angela, "Some Kind of Love Story" and dying woman, "Elegy for a Lady," in Two-Way Mirror (double-bill), Young Vic Theatre, London, 1989
 Rosetta Borsi, Sex Please, We're Italian, Young Vic Theatre, 1991
 Natalya Petrovna, A Month in the Country, Albery Theatre, London, 1994, then Criterion Theatre, New York City, 1995
 Cleopatra, Antony and Cleopatra, Royal National Theatre, London, 1998
 Collected Stories, Theatre Royal Haymarket, London, 1999
 Lady Torrance, Orpheus Descending, Donmar Warehouse, London, 2000
 Alice, The Dance of Death, Broadhurst Theatre, New York City, 2001
 Christine Mannon, Mourning Becomes Electra, Royal National Theatre, 2003
 Title role, Phèdre, Royal National Theatre, 2009
 Queen Elizabeth II, The Audience, Gielgud Theatre, London, 2013
 Queen Elizabeth II, The Audience, Gerald Schoenfeld Theatre, New York City, 2015

References 

Actress filmographies